Tian Liang (born 4 February 1986 in Mohe, Daxing'anling, Heilongjiang) is a female Chinese rower, who competed in the women's double sculls for the Chinese team at the 2008 Summer Olympics with team-mate Li Qin.  They finished in 4th place.  At the 2012 Summer Olympics, she was part of the Chinese women's quadruple sculls team that finishing in 5th place.

She and Li Qin were World Champions in the double sculls in 2007.

Major performances
2005 National Games – 1st fours;
2007 World Cup Austria – 1st double sculls;
2007 World Cup Netherlands – 1st double sculls;
2007 World Championships – 1st double sculls;
2008 World Cup Lucerne – 1st double sculls

References

 http://2008teamchina.olympic.cn/index.php/personview/personsen/337

1986 births
Living people
Chinese female rowers
Olympic rowers of China
People from Daxing'anling
Rowers at the 2008 Summer Olympics
Rowers at the 2012 Summer Olympics
Asian Games medalists in rowing
Rowers from Heilongjiang
Rowers at the 2006 Asian Games
Rowers at the 2010 Asian Games
World Rowing Championships medalists for China
Asian Games gold medalists for China
Medalists at the 2006 Asian Games
Medalists at the 2010 Asian Games
21st-century Chinese women